The 1950 VFL Grand Final was an Australian rules football game contested between the Essendon Football Club and North Melbourne Football Club, held at the Melbourne Cricket Ground on 23 September 1950. It was the 53rd annual Grand Final of the Victorian Football League, staged to determine the premiers for the 1950 VFL season. The match, attended by 85,869 spectators , was won by Essendon by 38 points, marking that club's tenth premiership victory.

Background

This was North Melbourne's first-ever VFL Grand Final, while Essendon were competing in their fifth successive premiership decider. They were the reigning premiers, having defeated Carlton in the 1949 VFL Grand Final. Essendon's victory sent the retiring Dick Reynolds out in style, although he would come out of retirement for one final game in 1951.

Teams

 Umpire – Jack McMurray, Jr.

Statistics

Goalkickers

Notes

References

Bibliography

External links

1950 Grand Final stats page on AFL Tables

See also
 1950 VFL season
Essendon–North Melbourne rivalry

VFL/AFL Grand Finals
Grand
Essendon Football Club
North Melbourne Football Club
September 1950 sports events in Australia